The T-Center is an office building in the Sankt Marx section of Landstraße, the 3rd district of Vienna. It was built between the years 2002 and 2004 following the designs of Austrian architect Günther Domenig.

History 
The beginning of construction of the T-Center in 2002 commenced a new development concerning town planning and construction in the area of the former cattle market and slaughterhouse in the Viennese quarter of Sankt Marx. Built after the plans of architect Günther Domenig and his team of Hermann Eisenköck, and Herfried Peyker, in an efficient time of only 27 months, the first offices were opened in 2004. The tenants of the office spaces are the Deutsche-Telekom subsidiaries T-Mobile, T-Systems and Software Daten Service. In addition, the ground floor is occupied by publicly accessible restaurants.

Criticism and awards 
Due to the unconventional form and the use of unfinished concrete surfaces the T-Center rapidly gathered attention beyond the city boundaries, however the public discussed the building quite controversially. Furthermore, the employees of the companies accommodated there criticized the structural peculiarities, expressing their preferences and opinions as to the design in relation to the building's practical usefulness.

Günther Domenig and the design team received the following awards for the T-Center:

 2004: Otto Wagner Städtebaupreis
 2006: Österreichischer Staatspreis for Architecture
 2006: The Chicago Athenaeum International Architecture Award for the best new global design

Data 
The T-Center has an effective area of 119,000 m² of office space for around 3,000 employees, with a gross area of 134,000 m². With a length of 255 meters, the building's height reaches 60 meters.

References

Matthias Boeckl, Thom Mayne. Gunther Domenig: Recent Work. Springer: March 11, 2005.
G Domenig, H Eisenkock, H Peyker. T-Center St. Marx Vienna. Birkhauser: September 1, 2005.

External links 
 T-Center-Infos von T-Mobile
 Cellular News, T-Mobile HQ Wins Architecture Prize

Buildings and structures in Landstraße
Office buildings in Vienna
Deutsche Telekom